Enkeyo Ketta Kural is a 1982 Indian Tamil-language drama film, directed by S. P. Muthuraman. The film stars Rajinikanth in the lead role, with Ambika and Radha playing his love interests and Meena as their daughter. The film was later remade in Telugu as Bava Maradallu in 1984, in Hindi as Suhaagan in 1986 and in Kannada as Midida Hrudayagalu in 1993.

Plot 
Kumaran, a hardworking but easily aggrieved and very righteous man, is in love with his first cousin Ponni. Ponni works a very leisurely and laid-back job in a grand mansion. Ponni's younger sibling Kamatchi is fond of Kumaran, but he does not take her seriously. Vishwanathan, the father of Ponni and Kamatchi, plans to get Kumaran and Ponni married. Ponni reluctantly marries Kumaran. A daughter, Meena, is born after a year. Ponni starts to detest Kumaran because of her newfound tasks. Later, her previous employer dies of old age. Ponni visits her employer's son (who is also unhappily married) after the funeral. They both converse about their supposedly miserable lives and decide to elope. After Ponni runs away, her family disowns her and decides to have Kamatchi marry Kumaran. The initially reluctant Kumaran is convinced by his father-in-law and marries Kamatchi. The pair bonds over time and lives in contentment with the child. Ponni realizes her blunder after a few weeks. Disgusted with herself, she leaves the eloped partner, remaining faithful to Kumaran by not engaging in any debauchery with her partner. He confers her a small house near the village, where she spends the rest of her life. She meets her daughter, but her sister, disgusted with Ponni, orders the child not to meet her ever again. Kumaran comes to learn about her faithfulness and visits Ponni on her deathbed. She dies by Kumaran's side after reminiscing about her life. Kumaran is warned by his father-in-law that he will be banished from the village if takes part in her funeral. Kumaran defies him and performs the last rites for Ponni along with their daughter and Kamatchi.

Cast 
 Rajinikanth as Kumaran
 Ambika as Ponni
 Radha as Kamatchi
 Meena as child Meena (daughter of Kumaran and Ponni)
 Delhi Ganesh as Vishwanathan
 Kamala Kamesh as Vishwanathan's wife
 V. S. Raghavan
 T. K. S. Natarajan
 K. Kannan
 Vairam Krishnamoorthy

Soundtrack 
The music was composed by Ilaiyaraaja.

Accolades 
 Filmfare Award for Best Film – Tamil
 Tamil Nadu State Film Award for Best Dialogue Writer – Panchu Arunachalam
 Tamil Nadu State Film Award for Best Film
 Film Fans Association Award for Best Actor – Rajinikanth

Release 
Enkeyo Ketta Kural was released on 14 August 1982. Due to competition from another Muthuraman-directed film Sakalakala Vallavan, released on the same day, it was less successful.

References

Bibliography

External links 
 

1980s Tamil-language films
1982 drama films
1982 films
Films directed by S. P. Muthuraman
Films scored by Ilaiyaraaja
Films with screenplays by Panchu Arunachalam
Indian drama films
Tamil films remade in other languages